The Bovo-Bukh ("Bovo book"; also known as Baba Buch, etc.;), written in 1507–1508 by Elia Levita, was the most popular chivalric romance in Yiddish. It was first printed in 1541, being the first non-religious book to be printed in Yiddish. For five centuries, it endured at least 40 editions. It is written in ottava rima and, according to Sol Liptzin, is "generally regarded as the most outstanding poetic work in Old Yiddish". [Liptzin, 1972, 5, 7]

The theme derives from the Anglo-Norman romance of Bevis of Hampton, by way of an Italian poem that had modified the name Bevis of Hampton to Buovo d'Antona and had, itself, been through at least thirty editions at the time of translation and adaptation into Yiddish. The central theme is the love of Bovo and Druziane. [Liptzin, 1972, 6], [Gottheil] The story "had no basis in Jewish reality", but compared to other chivalric romances it "tone[s] down the Christian symbols of his original" and "substitute[s] Jewish customs, Jewish values and Jewish traits of character here and there..." [Liptzin, 1972, 8]

The character was also popular in Russian folk culture as "Prince Bova".

The Bovo-Bukh later became known in the late 18th century as Bove-mayse "Bove's tale". This name was corrupted into bube mayse "grandmother's tale", meaning "old wives' tale". [Liptzin, 1972, 7]

Plot summary
Based on Sol Liptzin, A History of Yiddish Literature, pp. 6–7.

Bovo's young mother conspires to have her husband, an aged king, killed during a hunt, then marries the murderer. They try and fail to poison the child Bovo, whom they are afraid will avenge his father. The handsome youth runs away from Antona, is kidnapped and taken to Flanders to be stable boy to a king, whose daughter Druzane falls in love with him.

The heathen sultan of Babylonia arrives, backed by ten thousand warriors, to demand Druzane in marriage for his ugly son, Lucifer. He is refused; in the ensuing war the king of Flanders is captured. Bovo, riding the magic horse Pumele and wielding the magic sword Rundele, defeats the sultan's army, slays Lucifer, frees the king, and is promised the hand of Druzane, but is enticed to Babylonia, where he is horribly imprisoned for a year before escaping. Meanwhile, Druzane has presumed him dead and consented to marry the knight Macabron.

On the wedding day of Druzane and Macabron, Bovo arrives disguised as a beggar; he and Druzane flee, first to a palace but later to the forest, pursued by Macabron. Deep in the forest, Druzane gives birth to twins.

Bovo sets off to try to find a route back to Flanders. Druzane comes to the conclusion that Bovo has fallen prey to a lion, sets off on her own with the twins, and successfully reaches Flanders. Bovo returns to their forest abode; failing to find her or the twins, he now also presumes her to have fallen prey. Despairing, he joins an army ranged against his native Antona. He kills his stepfather, dispatches his mother to a nunnery, and takes his rightful crown. He is eventually reunited with Druzane, who becomes his queen.

Modern editions
 Elia Levita Bachur's Bovo-Buch: A Translation of the Old Yiddish Edition of 1541 with Introduction and Notes by Elia Levita Bachur, translated and notes by Jerry C. Smith, Fenestra Books, 2003, .

Original Yiddish editions online
Modern facsimile edition by Judah A. Joffe of Bovo Bukh at Open Library and a modern Yiddish translation in verse by M. Knapheis Bovo Bukh at Open Library

References
 Claudia Rosenzweig, Bovo d’Antona by Elye Bokher. A Yiddish Romance - A Critical Edition with Commentary, SJHC vol. 49, Brill, 2015, 
 Gottheil, Richard and Jacobs, Joseph   Baba Buch, Jewish Encyclopedia, 1901–1906
Liptzin, Sol, A History of Yiddish Literature, Jonathan David Publishers, Middle Village, NY, 1972, 
Shmeruk, Chone, "Prokim fun der yidisher literatur-geshikhte”, Peretz Farlag, Tel-Aviv 1988 (in Yiddish)
Wex, Michael, Born to Kvetch, St. Martin's Press, 2005. 
 Claudia Rosenzweig, Il Bovo de-Antona di Elia Bachur Levita e le sue fonti, Tesi Università degli studi di Milano, 1994/95, rel. M. L. Modena Mayer, 291 p.
 Claudia Rosenzweig, "La letteratura yiddish in Italia : l'esempio del Bovo de-Antona di Elye Bocher", ACME - Annali della Facoltà di lettere e filosofia dell'Università degli Studi di Milano, vol. 50, fasc. 3, 1997, p. 159-189.
 Claudia Rosenzweig, "Il poema yiddish in versi Bovo d'Antona in una versione manoscritta del XVI sec.", Medioevo Romanzo, vol. XXVI, fasc. I, gennaio-aprile 2002, pp. 49–68.
 Claudia Rosenzweig, "Kurtsvaylike Literatur. Il Bovo d’Antona e il romanzo cavalleresco in yiddish nell’Italia del Rinascimento", in: C. Rosenzweig, A.L. Callow, V. Brugnatelli, F. Aspesi (a cura di), Florilegio filologico e linguistico. Haninura de Bon Siman a Maria Luisa Mayer Modena, Milano, Cisalpino, 2008 , p. 169-188.
 Claudia Rosenzweig, "From the Square and the Court to the Private Space. Some Remarks on the Yiddish Version of the Chivalric Poem Bovo d’Antona", Zutot 5.1 (2008), pp. 53–62.

1508 books
1541 books
Yiddish-language literature
Romance (genre)
Jewish medieval literature
Bevis of Hampton